The Hara Cabinet is the 19th Cabinet of Japan led by Hara Takashi from September 29, 1918, to November 4, 1921.

Cabinet 

Following Hara's assassination on November 4, 1921, Uchida Kōsai served as acting Prime Minister from November 4 to 13, 1921.

References 

Cabinet of Japan
1918 establishments in Japan
Cabinets established in 1918
Cabinets disestablished in 1921